This article contains information on rugby league events played in 2009. The season commenced with a friendly match between Super League clubs Leeds Rhinos and Salford City Reds in the United States in January, and concluded with the Scottish tour of South Africa in December.

January
4 Auckland, New Zealand - Rising NRL star Sonny Fai is presumed dead after being swept out to sea at Bethells Beach.

February

March 
 1st: Leeds, England – The 2009 World Club Challenge is won by Australia's Manly-Warringah Sea Eagles who defeated England's Leeds Rhinos.
 13th: Australia – The 2009 NRL season begins with the first games of Round 1 being played.
 13th: England – The 2009 Super League XIV begins with the first games of Round 1 being played.
22nd: Maesteg, South Wales – 20-year-old forward Leon Walker collapses and dies on the field in a reserve match between Wakefield Wildcats and Celtic Crusaders.

April 

6th: France – The 75th anniversary of the creation of the French Rugby League.

May

8th

City vs. Country Origin

Teams:

ANZAC Test

Teams:

22
Bridgend, Wales - The first Super League game to involve no English club is played when Celtic Crusaders play against Catalans Dragons at Brewery Field.

June

England vs France
On 13 June England played the first rugby league international since the 2008 World Cup against France in Paris' Stade Jean-Bouin.

Teams:

France:
Constant Villegas (Toulouse); Vincent Duport (Catalans Dragons), Sébastien Planas (Toulouse), Jean-Philippe Baile (Catalans Dragons), Frédéric Vaccari (Catalans Dragons); Mickaël Murcia (Limoux), Thomas Bosc (Catalans Dragons); Rémi Casty (Catalans Dragons), Bentley (Catalans Dragons), Jérôme Guisset (Catalans Dragons, capt), Cyril Gossard (Catalans Dragons), Grégory Mounis (Catalans Dragons), Éric Anselme (Toulouse).

Replacements: Sébastien Martins (Pia), Romain Gagliazzo (Carcassonne), William Barthau (Catalans Dragons), Mathieu Griffi (Toulouse).

Coach: Bobbie Goulding

England:
Shaun Briscoe (Hull KR); Peter Fox (Hull KR), Michael Shenton (Castleford), Ryan Atkins (Wakefield), Ryan Hall (Leeds); Danny McGuire (Leeds), Richard Myler (Salford); Adrian Morley (Warrington), Scott Moore (Huddersfield), Jamie Peacock (Leeds, capt), Gareth Hock (Wigan), Ben Westwood (Warrington), Sam Burgess (Bradford).

Replacements: James Roby (St Helens), James Graham (St Helens), Tony Clubb (Harlequins), Eorl Crabtree (Huddersfield).

Coach: Tony Smith

July

August

September
 23rd – Sydney, Australia: The 11th annual Tom Brock Lecture, entitled The Lost Tribes of League – the fate of axed and merged clubs and their fans is delivered by Terry Williams.

October

4- Melbourne Storm defeat Parramatta Eels 23–16 to win the NRL Premiership

New Zealand vs. Tonga

New Zealand led 24–8 at half-time before Tonga fought back to level the scores at 24–24.  New Zealand scored 16 points in a row to win the match 40–24. Four New Zealand players, Bryson Goodwin, Junior Sa'u, Frank-Paul Nuuausala and Jared Waerea-Hargreaves, made their débuts.

England vs. Wales

The last time these two sides met, England won 74–0. Wales took an early lead in the match but England were too strong. England's Sam Tomkins scored a hat-trick of tries on his début. England defeated Wales away from home, 48–12.

November
14th: Leeds, England – The 2009 Four Nations tournament culminates in a final between Australia and England at Elland Road.

December
In Australia in 2009, rugby league's popularity was confirmed as it had the highest television ratings of any football code.

Super League

The English Super League will continue in 2009 with two more teams than in previous seasons. There used to be a relegation system whereby the lowest team in a season was relegated to National League 1 but this has now been abolished. Leeds Rhinos are the back-to-back defending champions after beating St Helens R.F.C. for the last two seasons.

National Rugby League

The National Rugby League (NRL), contested between 16 teams from Australia and New Zealand, will hold its 102nd season in 2009. The Melbourne Storm won this competition in 2009, winning the final 23–16 against the Parramatta Eels. This title was later stripped from the Storm due to salary cap breaches exposed by the NRL in 2010.

Four Nations

Later in the year, New Zealand, Australia, England and France will compete in a new 4 Nations competition. It replaces the previous Rugby League Tri-Nations, with France making its debut this year. All four teams have been playing regularly for a few years. However, due to France's poor performances at the 2008 Rugby League World Cup they may have to qualify to make this tournament.

Bartercard Premiership 

In August this competition will kick off. It started last year and features 6 teams all over New Zealand.

References

External links
 
 Rugby League international scores, 2009
 
 Rugby League Internationals

 
Rugby league by year